Stigmella maculifera is a moth of the family Nepticulidae. It was described by Puplesis and Diškus in 2003. It is known from the northern region of Oman.

References

Nepticulidae
Moths of Asia
Moths described in 2003